Robert S. Harris, nicknamed RoSHa, is the designer and programmer of several 1980s home computer and console games, including War Room (ColecoVision, 1983) and Killer Bees! (Odyssey 2, 1983).

Early life
Harris was born in Boalsburg, Pennsylvania and graduated from Carnegie Mellon University with a Bachelor of Science in Mathematics in 1979.

Works
Killer Bees! (1983)

References

External links 
Harris's web page

Video game designers
Video game programmers
Living people
Year of birth missing (living people)
Carnegie Mellon University alumni